Harold Hansen may refer to:
 Harold Hansen (soccer) (born 1946), Canadian soccer player 
 Harold Hansen (American football) (1894–1977),  American football and basketball coach
 Harold I. Hansen (1914–1992), theatre professor at Brigham Young University
 Harold D. Hansen (1904–1987), United States Marine Corps general

See also
 Harold Hanson (disambiguation)
 Harald Hansen (disambiguation)